Euthochtha is a genus of leaf-footed bugs in the family Coreidae (Coreid bugs), containing only one described species, E. galeator. It is sometimes referred to by the common name "helmeted squash bug".

References

Further reading

External links

 

Articles created by Qbugbot
Acanthocerini
Monotypic Hemiptera genera
Coreidae genera